Platina is a municipality in Brazil.

Platina may also refer to:

Platina, a New Zealand Company sailing ship that arrived in Wellington, New Zealand in 1840 with 2 settlers
Platina, California, an unincorporated community in the United States
Piadena ("Platina" in Latin), an Italian village
Bartolomeo Platina, a 15th-century author
Nissan Platina, one alternative name of the Renault Clio
Platina Records, a swedish independent record label.

See also
Platinum